Monte Armetta is a mountain in Piedmont, northern Italy, part of the Alps.  At an altitude of 1,739 metres is the highest summit of the Ligurian Prealps.

Etymology 
According to the historian Emanuele Celesia the name Armetta comes from Hermes, but other scholars think that it's a diminutive of arma, a local term used in Liguria for cave.

Geography 

The mountain stands on the main chain of the Alps between Tanaro and Arroscia valleys. It belongs to the province of Cuneo, in Piedmont, and is located on the border between the municipalities of Ormea and Caprauna, not faraway from Liguria.

SOIUSA classification 
According to the SOIUSA (International Standardized Mountain Subdivision of the Alps) the mountain can be classified in the following way:
 main part = Western Alps
 major sector =  South Western Alps
 section = Ligurian Alps
 subsection = Prealpi Liguri
 supergroup = Catena Settepani-Carmo-Armetta
 group = Gruppo Galero-Armetta
 subgroup = Costiera Galero-Armetta
 code = I/A-1.I-A.3.a

Environment 
The northern side of the mountain fells with overhanging cliffs towards Ormea, while its gentle southern slopes are covered of woods and pastures. On Monte Armetta, in spite of its not so high elevation, grow several typical mountain flowers as Leontopodium alpinum.

Access to the summit 
The mountain is accessible by off-road mountain paths and is crossed by the Alta Via dei Monti Liguri, a long-distance trail from Ventimiglia (province of Imperia) to Bolano (province of La Spezia).

It's also possible to reach monte Armetta from Madonna del Lago sanctuary (located several km from the centre of Alto) through a footpath with signposts, which also crosses Monte Dubasso (1,545 m).

References

Mountains of the Ligurian Alps
Mountains of Piedmont
One-thousanders of Italy